Chloroauric acid is an inorganic compound with the chemical formula . It forms hydrates . Both the trihydrate and tetrahydrate are known. Both are orange-yellow solids consisting of the planar  anion. Often chloroauric acid is handled as a solution, such as those obtained by dissolution of gold in aqua regia. These solutions can be converted to other gold complexes or reduced to metallic gold or gold nanoparticles.

Properties

Structure 
The Au–Cl distances are around 2.28 Å. Other d8 complexes adopt similar structures, e.g. tetrachloroplatinate(II) .

Solute properties 
Solid chloroauric acid is a hydrophilic (ionic) protic solute. It is soluble in water and other oxygen-containing solvents, such as alcohols, esters, ethers, and ketones. For example, in dry dibutyl ether or diethylene glycol, the solubility exceeds 1 M. Saturated solutions in the organic solvents often are the liquid solvates of specific stoichiometry. Chloroauric acid is a strong monoprotic acid.

When heated in air, solid  melts in the water of crystallization, quickly darkens and becomes dark brown.

Chemical reactions 
Since  is prone to hydrolyze, upon treatment with an alkali metal base, chloroauric acid converts to gold(III) hydroxide. The related thallium salt() is poorly soluble in all nonreacting solvents. Salts of quaternary ammonium cations are known.

Partial reduction of chloroauric acid gives oxonium dichloridoaurate(1−). Reduction may also yield other gold(I) complexes, especially with organic ligands. Often the ligand serves as reducing agent as illustrated with thiourea, :

Chloroauric acid is the precursor to gold nanoparticles by precipitation onto mineral supports. Gold nanostructures can be made from chloroauric acid in a two-phase redox reaction whereby metallic clusters are amassed through the simultaneous attachment of self-assembled thiol monolayers on the growing nuclei.  is transferred from aqueous solution to toluene using tetraoctylammonium bromide where it is then reduced with aqueous sodium borohydride in the presence of a thiol.

Production 
Chloroauric acid is produced by dissolving gold in aqua regia (a mixture of concentrated nitric and hydrochloric acids) followed by careful evaporation of the solution:

Under some conditions, oxygen can be used as an oxidant. For higher efficiency, these processes are conducted in autoclaves, which allows greater control of temperature and pressure. Alternatively, a solution of  can be produced by electrolysis of gold metal in hydrochloric acid:

To prevent the deposition of gold on the cathode, the electrolysis is carried out in a cell equipped with a membrane. This method is used for refining gold.

Uses 
Chloroauric acid is the precursor used in the purification of gold by electrolysis.

Liquid–liquid extraction of chloroauric acid is used for the recovery, concentrating, purification, and analytical determinations of gold. The concentration of gold(III) in the extracts may exceed 1 mol/L. Frequently used extractants for this purpose are dibutyl glycol, methyl isobutyl ketone, tributyl phosphate, dichlorodiethyl ether (chlorex).

In histology, chlorauric acid is known as "brown gold chloride", and its sodium salt  (sodium tetrachloroaurate(III)) as "gold chloride", "sodium gold chloride" or "yellow gold chloride". The sodium salt is used in a process called "toning" to improve the optical definition of tissue sections stained with silver.

Health effects and safety 
Chloroauric acid is a strong eye, skin, and mucous membrane irritant. Prolonged skin contact with chloroauric acid may result in tissue destruction. Concentrated chloroauric acid is corrosive to skin and must, therefore, be handled with appropriate care, since it can cause skin burns, permanent eye damage, and irritation to mucous membranes. Gloves are worn when handling the compound.

References 

Gold(III) compounds
Acids
Gold–halogen compounds
Chlorometallates
Aurates